Ectoedemia olvina is a moth of the family Nepticulidae. It was described by Puplesis in 1984. It is known from the Russian Far East and Japan.

The larvae feed on Acer mono.

References

Nepticulidae
Moths of Asia
Moths described in 1984